Brian Pinder Kellett (15 May 1914 – September 1944) was a British rock climber.

Life
Brian Kellett was born in 1914 in Weymouth, Dorset in South-West England. He was the son of Lt. Richard Pinder Kellett, whom he never knew; Kellett senior was killed commanding HMS Flirt in the battle of Dover (1916). The younger Kellett died with Nancy Forsyth in Castle Corrie on Ben Nevis during the first weekend in September 1944; the exact date is not known. He is buried in Glen Nevis.

Education and career 
Kellett was educated at public schools in south-west England where he gained a reputation as a "perfect all-round sportsman", playing on the cricket and rugby teams and also representing them at boxing (oddly, given his subsequent pacifism). He was a strong chess player and his analytic mind led him initially to qualify in accountancy, but he left the profession in favour of physically demanding forestry work in Ennerdale in Cumbria where he began to climb more seriously than on his early forays on the Tors of Dartmoor. With the coming of the second World War Kellett refused to serve on grounds of conscience and was interned for two years. He eventually proposed serving with the forestry on Skye where he could climb on the magnificent Cuillin ridge, but was posted at Torlundy instead. Kellett was by all accounts industrious, "born to work the land", in the words of a co-worker,

Climbing
The north-east face of Ben Nevis is a two-kilometre-long meandering cliff whose most prominent features are Tower Ridge and Carn Dearg Buttress. The corrie between these (Coire na Ciste) is divided at the back by three major gullies, numbered Two, Three and Four. When Kellett arrived at the face in 1942, Number Two Gully had yet to receive a summer ascent, having defeated both Harold Raeburn ("doyen of Scottish mountaineers") and G. Graham Macphee, editor of the 1936 climber's guide. Kellett led the first ascent on 30 August with J. A. Dunster, who at one point was forced to shelter off-rope from screes loosed by Kellett above him; sixty years later, the 2002 climber's guide still warns that "in summer the gully has a fierce reputation and is best avoided" (its grade is VS). Nevertheless, Kellett's achievement in 1942 was soon to be surpassed by his relentless attention to the face over the following two years.

First ascents
Kellett left an "unprecedented" legacy of new routes and variations on Ben Nevis in the summers of 1943 and 1944 (page references are to the SMC's 2002 Climbers' Guide, edited by Simon Richardson):

Accidents
Kellett suffered 3 significant falls before his fatal accident with Nancy Forsyth. Perhaps most remarkably in January 1943 he survived falling the length of Glover's Chimney from Tower Gap, a fall of about 300m, losing his ice axe but suffering no serious injury. After one of these falls J.H.B. Bell, a leading climber of his day, became concerned about Kellett's safety as a climber and voiced these concerns to Nancy Forsyth.

Commemoration
His sister Lorna commissioned a memorial to Kellett and his father in Glen Nevis.

References

1914 births
1944 deaths
People from Weymouth, Dorset
British rock climbers
Sport deaths in Scotland
Mountaineering deaths
English conscientious objectors